John Douglas Story , an Australian businessman, was previously a chairman and/or director of a number of Australian listed corporations.

Story is the grandson of John Douglas Story, a prominent Queensland public servant.

Career 
After a career as a lawyer, predominantly with law firm Corrs Chambers Westgarth, Story took on a number of directorships.  Story's directorships have included:
 Echo Entertainment Group (2011–2012). In June 2012, chairman of rival Crown Limited, James Packer, put pressure on the Echo board to remove Story.  Despite Story wanting a shareholder vote on his continuation, he agreed to resign 
 CSR Ltd (2003–2012) 
 Suncorp Group Ltd (1995 – 2011, chairman 2003 – 2011) 
 Tabcorp Holdings Ltd (2004 – 2011, chairman 2007 – 2011) 
 Magontec Ltd (2001–2005) 

John Story was the 13th Chancellor of The University of Queensland from 2009 until 2016. He was preceded by Llew Edwards and succeeded by Peter Varghese. John Story's grandfather, John D. Story was the Vice-Chancellor of The University of Queensland from 1938 to 1960.

References

Living people
20th-century births
Australian casino industry businesspeople
Officers of the Order of Australia
Year of birth missing (living people)